The distance medley relay (DMR) is an athletic event in which four athletes compete as part of a relay. With its inclusion in the IAAF World Relays program, the IAAF announced on May 1, 2015 that the event would be an official world record event.

Unlike most track relays, each member of the team runs a different distance. A distance medley relay is made up of a 1200-meter leg (three laps on a standard 400 meter track), a 400-meter leg (one lap), an 800-meter leg (two laps), and a 1600-meter leg (four laps) in that order. The total distance run is 4000 meters, or nearly 2.5 miles.  Aside from the 400 meter segment, which is a sprint, all legs are a middle distance run.  Prior to going metric, the distance medley relay consisted of a 440-yard leg, an 880-yard leg, a 1320-yard leg and a one-mile leg.  The total distance for the old distance medley relay was 4400 yards and the total distance for the current metric distance medley relay is 4374.45 yards - slightly over 25 yards shorter than the old race.

World best

Men
The United States currently holds world record in the men's DMR with a time of 9:15.50, set on May 3, 2015.  This was set during the 2015 IAAF World Relays at Thomas Robinson Stadium, located in Nassau, Bahamas. The team consisted of Kyle Merber 2:53.56 (1200m), Brycen Spratling 45.95 (400m), Brandon Johnson 1:44.75 (800m), and Ben Blankenship 3:51.24 (1600m).  They shaved off 0.06s from Kenya's previous world record time set in 2006.

The Kenyan team of 2006 ran the DMR in 9:15.56, currently the second fastest time ever run.  At the time of the IAAF announcement of world record status, this mark became the ratified world record.  Elkanah Angwenyi in 2:50.8 (1,200 meters), Thomas Musembi in 45.8 (400), Alfred Yego in 1:46.2 (800) and Alex Kipchirchir in 3:52.8 (1,600). This mark was set on April 29, 2006, at the Penn Relays in Philadelphia, Pennsylvania.

The Oklahoma State Track and Field team of Fouad Messaoudi in 2:49.49 (1,200 meters), DJ McArthur in 46.82 (400), Hafez Mahadi in 1:47.27 (800), and Ryan Schoppe in 3:52.84 (1,600) currently hold the indoor world best in a time of 9:16.40. The mark was set on February 17, 2023 at the Arkansas Qualifier in Fayetteville, Arkansas.

Women
At the same 2015 IAAF World Relays, the women's world record was set by the American team of Treniere Moser 3:18.38 (1200m), Sanya Richards-Ross (50.12) (400m), Ajee' Wilson 2:00.08 (800m), and Shannon Rowbury 4:27.92 (1600m) running 10:36.50. They beat the outdoor record of 10:48.38 set by a team from Villanova University of Kathy Franey (1200m), Michelle Bennett (400m), Celeste Halliday (800m), and Vicki Huber (1600m) at the Penn Relays in April 1988 in Philadelphia, Pennsylvania 27 years earlier.

The United States women's team of Sarah Brown, Mahagony Jones, Megan Krumpoch, and Brenda Martinez set the first indoor world record for the event with a time of 10:42.57 at New Balance Indoor Grand Prix in 2015. At the time of the IAAF announcement, this time, superior to the best time outdoors, became the ratified world record even though it was set on an indoor banked track.

On April 15, 2022 an American team consisting of Heather MacLean, Kendall Ellis, Roisin Willis and Elle Purrier St. Pierre set the current best indoor time of 10:33.85 at The TRACK in Boston. Nevertheless the distance medley relay is only a world record discipline outdoors it is a subject to usual ratification procedure to become an outright world record because their time bettered the outdoor mark of 10:36.50.

All-time top 25

Men
Updated February 2023.

Women
Updated February 2023.

See also
 Sprint medley relay
 Swedish relay

References

Track relay races